Piliyandala Central College is a selective entry mixed-gender school located in Piliyandala, Sri Lanka. It was the first government-run mixed-gender secondary school in the country.

The school has an enrollment of around 3,700 students. Students of the college are known as Centralions and past pupils are known as Old Centralions.

History 

The school was first established in 1887 as the Mampe Piyarathanasara Buddhist Mix School, one of the first Buddhist schools in Sri Lanka. As the school grew in size, Rev. Mampe Saranapala Thero handed over the school to the Buddhist Theosophical Society for better administration. The society bought new land for the school but due to the rapid increase in the number of students, was unable to maintain it, and so eventually handed it over to the government.

In 1920, as a part of a program of the British agent of western province Mr Praiser, Piliyandala got a Public English Medium Mix School. The headmaster of this school was S. W. Sahabandu, and the two schools (the public English medium mix school and the Sinhalese medium mix school) were divided by a building that was shaped like a bird.

From 1920 to 1944, C. W. W. Kannangara reunited both schools and together formed Piliyandala Central College on 4 January 1944, which later on 4 March that year was converted into a Central College.

Administration
The college is funded by the Ministry of Education, which also appoints its principal. The principal is the head of the administration of the college and is assisted by the deputy principal. The college is divided into two main parts, which are the middle and high schools, each coming under the supervision of the assistant principals. The college educates around 3,700 students.

Since its establishment, the main language of education had been Sinhalese. In 2009, English was introduced as an optional language of education for the main subjects at the college. Students may select one of the two languages in which to conduct their studies in the main subjects.

Admission
Admission to the college is among the most competitive outside the Colombo city area in the Colombo district. It gets its highest number of applications for admission to grade 6 via the grade 5 scholarship examination. A number of students from all over the area are also entered to grade 12 via the G.C.E. Ordinary Level examination.

Campus

The facilities include lecture halls, science and ICT laboratories, an auditorium, a swimming pool complex and a cricket ground.

Sports
Sport plays a significant part in college life. An annual cricket match between Central College Piliyandala and sporting rivals Taxila Central College, Horana, known as the Battle of the Salpiti-Raigam, has been held since 2001.

Houses 
Each student is assigned to one of four houses named after ancient Sinhala kings of Sri Lanka: Gemunu, Wijaya, Parakrama and Thissa.

See also 
 Education in Sri Lanka
 Madhya Maha Vidyalaya
 List of schools in Sri Lanka

References

External links
 Piliyandala Central College Official Website

Provincial schools in Sri Lanka
Educational institutions established in 1887
Schools in Colombo District
National schools in Sri Lanka
1887 establishments in Ceylon